María Eliana Nett Sierpe (19 September 1948 – 10 February 2022) was a Chilean actress and cultural manager, mainly active in theatre and television.

Life and career 
Born in Osorno, Nett studied theatre at the Pontifical Catholic University of Chile. She made her professional debut in 1975, but had her breakout three years later, as co-protagonist of the telenovela , which was followed by a number of other popular television works between 1980s and early 2000s, mainly for Canal 13.  She retired from acting in 2005.

Besides her acting career, Nette was a prominent cultural activist and manager: among other things she was president of Sidarte (the Chilean Actors and Actresses Union) between 2002 and 2006, a member of its board of directors from 2008 until 2020, and served as vice-president of IFCCD (International Federation of Coalitions for Cultural Diversity). Nett died on 10 February 2022, at the age of 73.

References

External links 
 

1948 births
2022 deaths
Chilean film actresses
Chilean stage actresses
Chilean television actresses
Pontifical Catholic University of Chile alumni
People from Osorno, Chile